William Smith (Sydney was a rugby league footballer in the New South Wales Rugby Football League premiership, Australia's first major competition in the sport.

Smith, who played on the wing position, has the honour of being the first ever try scorer for the Eastern Suburbs club. The try, which came in Easts' opening match, is the only try he scored for the Tricolours. He was a member of the Eastern Suburbs side that was defeated by South Sydney in the  first ever NSWRL premiership decider.

Smith moved to the Balmain club the following year before returning to the Eastern Suburbs club for the 1912 season, the year the club won its second premiership.

References
The Encyclopedia of Rugby League Players, by Alan Whiticker and Glen Hudson

Australian rugby league players
Balmain Tigers players
Sydney Roosters players
Rugby league wingers
Year of birth missing
Year of death missing
Rugby league players from Sydney